Kim Holland (born August 6, 1955) is an American politician and insurance professional from the U.S. state of Oklahoma. Holland served as the Oklahoma Insurance Commissioner until January 2011. She was appointed to that position by Governor Brad Henry in 2005, following the indictment and resignation of her predecessor, Carroll Fisher. The second woman to serve as the state insurance commissioner, she was re-elected in 2006 to her own four-year term. In 2010, attempting to gain her second full term in office, Holland faced Republican nominee John D. Doak, who defeated her in November's general election. Doak assumed office on January 10, 2011.

2006 election 
After her appointment in 2005, Holland faced a tough challenge from Bill Case, a former state representative, in 2006. Case trailed behind Holland in fundraising, raising $135,244 to Holland's $717,000 by the end of October.

During the election an independent group known as "Just the Facts America" launched a blistering attack upon Holland on television, citing her lack of a college education and legal insurance industry contributions to Holland's campaign. It was later revealed that "Just the Facts America" was in fact a misnomer for an attack organization of an interesting ethical persuasion largely subsidized by Texas businessman Gene Phillips, whom Holland has often opposed.

In the end, Holland was able to collect 52 percent of the votes to carry the election.

Insurance Commissioner

Medicare 
In May 2007, Holland made national headlines with her market conduct exam on Humana, a large provider of Medicare supplemental insurance. Holland's market conduct exam proved widespread misconduct by agents working for Humana, including that consumers were enrolled in Humana products that "they did not understand and did not want". Holland was called to testify before the United States Senate Committee on Aging, saying "As insurance commissioner, I currently have greater authority to address a consumer's problem with pet insurance than I do protecting the half a million Oklahoma senior citizens covered under a Medicare Prescription Drug or Advantage plan".

Holland's is the first major investigation of its type against a company selling Medicare related products.

Robocalls 
On April 21, 2009, Holland issued an Emergency Cease and Desist Order against Vehicle Services Inc. (VSI) for attempting to sell insurance products in violation of Oklahoma law, according to the order. Holland initiated an investigation after the
company randomly called an Insurance Department Anti-Fraud Investigator at her home. VSI was using robocall to randomly dial numbers in Oklahoma and other states without respect to whether the phone number was on a "do not call" list or was a cell phone.

"Our primary responsibility is to protect the citizens and policyholders of our state, and it is a
role I take very seriously," said Holland. "Insurers are required by law to register and maintain a
license in order to do business in Oklahoma.

Shortly after the action, other states began taking action against VSI. On May 11, 2009, Senator Chuck Schumer of New York, requested a federal investigation against the company.

Election results

External links 
 Campaign Website
 Oklahoma Insurance Department

References 

1955 births
Living people
Politicians from Tulsa, Oklahoma
Oklahoma Insurance Commissioners
Women in Oklahoma politics
Place of birth missing (living people)
Oklahoma Democrats
21st-century American women
Candidates in the 2010 United States elections